Ashkar bin Hasbollah is a Malaysian politician from USNO. He was the Member of Parliament for Marudu from 1978 to 1982 and the Member of Sabah State Legislative Assembly for Tempasuk from 1976 to 1981.

Election results

References 

20th-century Malaysian politicians
Malaysian Muslims
People from Sabah
United Sabah National Organisation politicians
Members of the Dewan Rakyat
Members of the Sabah State Legislative Assembly
Malaysian people of Malay descent
Living people
Year of birth missing (living people)